La unidad is a Spanish police thriller television series. Produced by Movistar+ in collaboration with Vaca Films, created by Dani de la Torre and Alberto Marini, and starring Nathalie Poza, Michel Noher, Luis Zahera, Raúl Fernández, Carlos Blanco and Fele Martínez, it was released on Movistar + on 15 May 2020. It was renewed for a season 2 on 22 May 2020, which was released on 18 March 2022.

Premise 
The plot follows an anti-terrorist special police unit of the General Commissariat of Information investigating a jihadist cell seeking to carry out a terrorist attack in Spain. The fiction is set in different locations such as France (Toulouse), Nigeria (Lagos), Syria (Raqqa), Tangiers, Melilla, Catalonia (Girona), Vigo and Madrid.

Cast 
 Nathalie Poza as Carla.
 Michel Noher as Marcos.
 Marian Álvarez as Miriam.
 Luis Zahera as Sergio.
  as Nawja.
  as Roberto.
  as Ramón.
 Fele Martínez as Sanabria.
 Amina Leony as Amina. 
 Moussa Echarif as Myaz.

Production and release 
Created by Dani de la Torre and Alberto Marini, Dani de la Torre directed the episodes while Alberto Marini and  authored the screenplay. Domingo Corral, Fran Araújo, Ismael Calleja, Emma Lustres and Borja Pena were credited as executive producers.  worked as cinematography director.

The series is a Movistar+ production, in collaboration with Vaca Films. The budget of the series was in the top-tier of Movistar+'s productions, similar to that of La peste's first season, about 10 million €. While some outdoor shots were filmed in Nigeria, France and Tangiers, most of the filming (about 85%) took place in Galicia. Some scenes were filmed in Melilla and a complex terrorist attack scene was shot in Callao, Preciados and Sol in Madrid. The series, consisting of six 50-minute episodes, was released on 15 May 2020 on Movistar+, both in the subscription platform and the Movistar+ Lite VoD service.

Filming of Season 2 began in April 2021 and wrapped in July 2021. Oskar Santos and Dani de la Torre directed the episodes whereas the screenplay was written by Alberto Marini, Amèlia Mora, Alfred Pérez-Farga and Roger Danès.

Accolades 

|-
| rowspan = "4" align = "center" | 2021
| rowspan = "4" | 8th 
| colspan = "2" | Best Drama Series
| 
| align = "center" rowspan = "4" | 
|-
| Best Direction || Dani de la Torre || 
|-
| Best Drama Actor || Luis Zahera ||  
|-
| Best Drama Actress || Nathalie Poza || 
|-
| align = "center" | 2022 || 28th Forqué Awards || colspan = "2" | Best TV Series ||  || 
|-
| rowspan = "5" align = "center" | 2023 || rowspan = "3" | 10th Feroz Awards || Best Actress in a TV Series || Nathalie Poza ||  || rowspan = "3" | 
|-
| Best Supporting Actress in a TV Series || Marian Álvarez || 
|-
| Best Supporting Actor a TV Series || Luis Zahera || 
|-
| rowspan = "2" | 31st Actors and Actresses Union Awards || Best Television Actress in a Leading Role || Nathalie Poza ||  || rowspan = "2" | 
|-
| Best Television Actress in a Minor Role || Yassmine Othman || 
|}

References

External links 
 

2020 Spanish television series debuts
Movistar+ network series
Spanish television series about terrorism
2020s Spanish drama television series
Television shows filmed in Spain
Television shows set in Galicia (Spain)
Television shows set in Madrid
Television shows set in Catalonia
Television shows set in Lagos
Television shows set in Morocco
Television shows set in France
Television shows set in Syria
Spanish-language television shows